Meredith Susanna Cara Kercher (28 December 1985 – 1 November 2007) was a British student on exchange from the University of Leeds who was murdered at the age of 21 in Perugia, Italy. Kercher was found dead on the floor of her bedroom. By the time the bloodstained fingerprints at the scene were identified as belonging to Rudy Guede, an African migrant, police had charged Kercher's American roommate, Amanda Knox, and Knox's Italian boyfriend, Raffaele Sollecito. The subsequent prosecutions of Knox and Sollecito received international publicity, with forensic experts and jurists taking a critical view of the evidence supporting the initial guilty verdicts.

Guede was tried separately in a fast-track procedure, and in October 2008, was found guilty of the sexual assault and murder of Kercher. He subsequently exhausted the appeals process and began serving a 16-year sentence. On 4 December 2020, an Italian court ruled that Guede could complete his term doing community service. Guede was released from prison on November 24, 2021.

Knox and Sollecito were released after almost four years following their acquittal at a second-level trial. Knox immediately returned to the United States.

The appeals verdicts of acquittal were declared null, however, for "manifest illogicalities" by the Supreme Court of Cassation of Italy in 2013. The appeals trials had to be repeated; they took place in Florence, where the two were convicted again in 2014.

The convictions of Knox and Sollecito were eventually annulled by the Supreme Court on 27 March 2015. The Supreme Court of Cassation invoked the provision of art. 530 § 2. of Italian Procedure Code ("reasonable doubt") and ordered that no further trial should be held, which resulted in their acquittal and the end of the case. The verdict pointed out that as scientific evidence was "central" to the case, there were "sensational investigative failures", "amnesia", and "culpable omissions" on the part of the investigating authorities.

Meredith Kercher

Background
Meredith Susanna Cara Kercher (born 28 December 1985 in Southwark, South London), known to her friends as "Mez", lived in Coulsdon, South London. Kercher attended the Old Palace School in Croydon. She was enthusiastic about the language and culture of Italy, and after a school exchange trip, she returned at age 15 to spend her summer vacation with a family in Sessa Aurunca.

Kercher studied European politics and Italian at the University of Leeds. Working as a barmaid, tour guide, and in promotions to support herself, she made a cameo appearance in the music video for Kristian Leontiou's song "Some Say" in 2004. She aspired to work for the European Union or as a journalist. In October 2007, she attended the University of Perugia, where she began courses in modern history, political theory, and the history of cinema. Fellow students later described her as caring, intelligent, witty, and popular.

Via della Pergola 7
Perugia, a well-known cultural and artistic centre, is a city of 150,000 people. More than a quarter of the population are students, many from abroad, giving it a vibrant social scene. In Perugia, Kercher shared a four-bedroom, ground-floor flat in a house at Via della Pergola 7 
Her flatmates were two Italian women in their late 20s, Filomena Romanelli and Laura Mezzetti, and a 20-year-old American student from the University of Washington, Amanda Knox, who was attending the University for Foreigners in Perugia on an exchange year. Kercher and Knox moved in on 10 and 20 September 2007, respectively, meeting each other for the first time. Kercher typically called her mother daily on a mobile phone; a second mobile phone she used was registered to her flatmate, Romanelli.

The lower level of the house was occupied by four young Italian men with whom both Kercher and Knox were friendly. Late one night in mid-October, Kercher and Knox met Rudy Guede when they returned home at 2:00 am. Guede had been invited into the lower-level flat by some of the Italian tenants, to whom he had attached himself. At 4:30 am, Kercher and Knox left.

Also in mid-October, Kercher and Knox attended the EuroChocolate festival. On 25 October 2007, Kercher and Knox attended a classical music concert, where Knox met Raffaele Sollecito, a 23-year-old computer-science student, at the University of Perugia.

Last sighting
The first of November was a public holiday in Italy. Kercher's Italian flatmates were out of town, as were the occupants of the downstairs flat. That evening, Kercher had dinner with three English women at one of their homes.

By Knox's account, having spent the night with Sollecito, she arrived at Via della Pergola 7 on the morning of 2 November 2007, finding the front door open and drops of blood in the bathroom she shared with Kercher. Kercher's bedroom door was locked, which Knox took as indicating that Kercher was sleeping. After showering in the bathroom Kercher and she shared, Knox found faeces in the toilet of the bathroom shared by Romanelli and Mezzetti. Knox went back to Sollecito's home and later returned with him to Via della Pergola 7. Noticing a broken window in Romanelli's bedroom and alarmed that Kercher did not answer her door, Sollecito unsuccessfully tried to force the door open. Sollecito called his sister, a lieutenant in the carabinieri, for advice. She advised him to call the 112 emergency number, which he did.

Discovery of the body
After receiving a phone call from Knox, Romanelli arrived at the flat. In rummaging around, looking for anything that might be missing, Romanelli inadvertently disturbed the crime scene. On discovering that the two phones Kercher typically carried with her had been found in a nearby garden, Romanelli became concerned and requested that the police force open the door to Kercher's bedroom, but the police declined. Instead, Romanelli's male friend forced the door open around 1:15 pm, and the body of Kercher was found inside, lying on the floor, covered by a duvet.

Autopsy
Pathologist Luca Lalli, from Perugia's forensic-science institute, performed the autopsy on Kercher's body. Her injuries consisted of 16 bruises and seven cuts. These included several bruises and a few insubstantial cuts on the palm of her hand. Bruises on her nose, nostrils, mouth, and underneath her jaw were compatible with a hand being clamped over her mouth and nose. Lalli's autopsy report was reviewed by three pathologists from Perugia's forensic-science institute, who interpreted the injuries, including some to the genital region, as indicating an attempt to immobilize Kercher during sexual violence.

Burial
A funeral was held on 14 December 2007 at Croydon Minster, with more than 300 people in attendance, followed by a private burial at Mitcham Road Cemetery. The degree that Kercher would have received in 2009 was awarded posthumously by the University of Leeds.

Meredith Kercher scholarship fund
Five years after the murder, the city of Perugia and its University for Foreigners, in co-operation with the Italian embassy in London, instituted a scholarship fund to honour the memory of Meredith Kercher. John Kercher stated in an interview that all profits from his book Meredith would go to a charitable foundation in Meredith Kercher's name.

Italian criminal procedure

In Italy, individuals accused of any crime are considered innocent until proven guilty, although the defendant may be held in detention. Unless the accused opts for a fast-track trial, murder cases are heard by a corte d'assise or court of assizes⁠ ⁠. This court has jurisdiction to try the most serious crimes, i.e., those crimes whose maximum penalty begins at 24 years in prison. A guilty verdict is not regarded as a definitive conviction until the accused has exhausted the appeals process, regardless of the number of times the defendant has been put on trial.

Italian trials can last many months and have long gaps between hearings; the first trial of Knox and Sollecito was heard two days a week, for three weeks a month. If found guilty, a defendant is guaranteed what is in effect a retrial, where all evidence and witnesses can be re-examined.

A verdict can be overturned by the Italian supreme court, the Corte di Cassazione (cassation is the annulment of a judicial decision), which considers written briefs. If the Corte di Cassazione overturns a verdict, it explains which legal principles were violated by the lower court, which in turn must abide by the ruling when retrying the case. If the Corte di Cassazione upholds a guilty verdict of the appeal trial, the conviction becomes definitive, the appeals process is exhausted, and any sentence is served.

Rudy Guede 

Rudy Hermann Guede (born 26 December 1986, Abidjan, Ivory Coast) was 20 years old at the time of the murder. He had lived in Perugia since the age of five. In Italy, Guede was raised with the help of his school teachers, a local priest, and others. Guede's father returned to Ivory Coast in 2004. Guede, then aged 17, was adopted by a wealthy Perugian family. He played basketball for the Perugia youth team in the 2004–2005 season. Guede said that he had met a couple of the Italian men from the lower level of Via della Pergola 7 while spending evenings at the basketball court in the Piazza Grimana. In mid-2007, his adoptive family asked him to leave their home.

The young men who lived in the downstairs flat at Via della Pergola 7 were unable to recall when Guede had met them, but they did recall how, after his first visit to their home, they had found him later in the bathroom, sitting asleep on the unflushed toilet, which was full of faeces. Guede allegedly committed break-ins, including one of a lawyer's office through a second-floor window, and another during which he burgled a flat and brandished a pocket knife when confronted. On 27 October 2007, days before Kercher's murder, Guede was arrested in Milan after breaking into a nursery school; he was reportedly found by police with an  knife that had been taken from the school kitchen.

Guede went to a friend's house around 11:30 pm on 1 November 2007, the night of the murder. He later went to a nightclub, where he stayed until 4:30 am. On the following night, 2 November 2007, Guede went to the same nightclub with three American female students whom he had met in a bar. He then left Italy for Germany, where he was located in the subsequent weeks.

Trial
After his fingerprints were found at the crime scene, Guede was extradited from Germany; he had said on the internet that he knew he was a suspect and wanted to clear his name. Guede opted for a fast-track trial, held in closed session with no reporters present. He told the court that he had gone to Via della Pergola 7 on a date arranged with Kercher, after meeting her the previous evening. Two neighbours of Guede's, foreign female students who were with him at a nightclub on that evening, told police the only girl they saw him talking to had long, blonde hair. Guede said Kercher had let him in the cottage around 9 pm. Sollecito's lawyers said a glass fragment from the window found beside a shoeprint of Guede's at the scene of the crime was proof that Guede had broken in.

Guede said that Kercher and he had kissed and touched, but did not have sexual intercourse because they did not have condoms readily available. He claimed that he then developed stomach pains and crossed to the large bathroom on the other side of the apartment. Guede said he heard Kercher scream while he was in the bathroom, and that upon emerging, he saw a shadowy figure holding a knife and standing over her as she lay bleeding on the floor. Guede further stated that the man fled, while saying in perfect Italian, "Trovato negro, trovato colpevole; andiamo" ("Found black man, found culprit; let's go").

The court found that his version of events did not match the scientific evidence, and that he could not explain why one of his palm prints, stained with Kercher's blood, had been found on the pillow of the single bed, under the disrobed body. Guede said he had left Kercher fully dressed. He was found guilty in October 2008 of murder and sexual assault, and sentenced to 30 years imprisonment. Judge Micheli acquitted Guede of theft.

Appeal

Guede originally said that Knox had not been at the scene of the crime, but he later changed his story to say that she had been in the apartment at the time of the murder. He claimed that he had heard her arguing with Kercher, and that, glancing out of a window, he had seen Knox's silhouette outside the house.

Three weeks after Knox and Sollecito were convicted, Guede had his prison term cut from 30 to 24 years before the automatic one-third reduction given for the fast-track trial, resulting in a final sentence of 16 years. A lawyer representing the Kercher family protested at the "drastic reduction" in the sentence. Guede had his first 36-hour release in June 2016, after nine years of prison. He was refused permission to appeal against his conviction in 2017.

Release

Guede was released from prison in November 2021, with a judge bringing forward his release date.

Amanda Knox and Raffaele Sollecito

In outlining the case for colleagues hours after the discovery of the body, Perugia Reparto volanti (Mobile Squad) Detective Superintendent Monica Napoleoni told them that the murderer was definitely not a burglar and that apparent signs of a break-in were staged as a deliberate deception. Knox was the only occupant of the house who had been nearby on the night of the murder; she said she had spent the night of 1 November with Sollecito at his flat. Over the next four days, Knox was repeatedly interviewed without being given access to a lawyer. She later testified that she was subjected to pressure tactics and struck by police to make her incriminate herself. She was arrested and charged with murder at noon on 6 November 2007.

Arrests
Napoleoni was backed by several other detectives in arguing for the arrest of Knox, Sollecito, and Patrick Lumumba, the latter whom Knox had implicated as being involved. However, Napoleoni's immediate superior, Chief Superintendent Marco Chiacchiera, thought arrests would be premature and advocated close surveillance of the suspects as the best way to further the investigation. On 8 November 2007, Knox, Sollecito, and Lumumba appeared before Judge Claudia Matteini, and during an hour-long adjournment, Knox met her lawyers for the first time. Matteini ordered Knox, Sollecito, and Lumumba to be detained for a year. On 19 November 2007, the Rome forensic police matched fingerprints found in Kercher's bedroom to Rudy Guede. On 20 November 2007, Guede was arrested in Germany, and Lumumba was released. The prosecution charged Guede with the murder.

Pretrial publicity
Knox became the subject of intense media attention. Shortly before her trial, she began legal action against Fiorenza Sarzanini, the author of a best-selling book about her, which had been published in Italy. The book included accounts of events as imagined or invented by Sarzanini, witness transcripts not in the public record, and selected excerpts from Knox's private journals, which Sarzanini had somehow obtained. Lawyers for Knox said the book had "reported in a prurient manner, aimed solely at arousing the morbid imagination of readers".

According to American legal commentator Kendal Coffey, "In this country we would say, with this kind of media exposure, you could not get a fair trial". In the United States, a pretrial publicity campaign supported Knox and attacked Italian investigators, but her lawyer thought it was counterproductive.

Knox and Sollecito trials
Knox and Sollecito were held in prison. Their trial began on 16 January 2009 before Judge Giancarlo Massei, Deputy Judge Beatrice Cristiani, and six lay judges at the Corte d'Assise of Perugia. The charges were that Knox, Sollecito, and Guede had murdered Kercher in her bedroom. Knox and Sollecito both pleaded not guilty.

According to the prosecution, Knox had attacked Kercher in her bedroom, repeatedly banged her head against a wall, forcefully held her face, and tried to strangle her. Mignini suggested Knox had taunted Kercher and may have said, "You acted the goody-goody so much, now we are going to show you. Now you're going to be forced to have sex!" The prosecution hypothesized that Guede, Knox, and Sollecito had removed Kercher's jeans, and held her on her hands and knees while Guede sexually abused her; that Knox had cut Kercher with a knife before inflicting the fatal stab wound; and that she had then stolen Kercher's mobile phones and money to fake a burglary. On 5 December 2009, Knox and Sollecito were convicted of murder and sentenced to 26 and 25 years' imprisonment, respectively.

The appeal (or second grade) trial began in November 2010, presided over by Judges Claudio Pratillo Hellmann and Massimo Zanetti. A court-ordered review of the contested DNA evidence by independent experts noted numerous basic errors in the gathering and analysis of the evidence, and concluded that no evidential trace of Kercher's DNA had been found on the alleged murder weapon. Although the review confirmed the DNA fragments on the bra clasp included some from Sollecito, an expert testified that the context strongly suggested contamination.

On 3 October 2011, Knox and Sollecito were acquitted. A ruling that proof was insufficient, similar to the verdict of not proven, was available to the court, but the court acquitted Knox and Sollecito completely. The conviction of Knox on a charge of slander of Patrick Lumumba was upheld, and the original one-year sentence was increased to three years and eleven days' imprisonment.

In their official report on the court's decision to overturn the convictions, the appeal trial judges wrote that the verdict of guilty at the original trial "was not corroborated by any objective element of evidence". Describing the police interviews of Knox as of "obsessive duration", the judges said that the statements she made incriminating herself and Lumumba during interrogation were evidence of her confusion while under "great psychological pressure". The judges further noted that a tramp who had testified to seeing Sollecito and Knox in the Piazza Grimana on the night of the murder was a heroin addict; that Massei, the judge at the 2009 trial, had used the word "probably" 39 times in his report; and that no evidence existed of any phone calls or texts between Knox or Sollecito, and Guede.

New trial
Following a successful prosecution request, a rehearing of Knox and Sollecito's second-level trial was held. The only new evidence came from the court-ordered analysis of a previously unexamined sample of the blade of Sollecito's kitchen knife, which the prosecution had alleged was the murder weapon. When the unexamined sample was tested by court-appointed experts for the new appeal trial, no DNA belonging to Kercher was found. Despite the negative result for the prosecution case, the court returned verdicts of guilty against the defendants, who both appealed.

Acquittal of murder charge
On 27 March 2015, Italy's highest court, the Court of Cassation, ruled that Knox and Sollecito were innocent of murder, thereby definitively ending the case. Rather than merely declaring that errors occurred in the earlier court cases or that evidence was insufficient to convict, the court ruled that Knox and Sollecito had not committed the murder and were innocent of those charges, but it upheld Knox's conviction for slandering Patrick Lumumba.

After this verdict was announced, Knox, who had been in the United States continuously since 2011, said in a statement: "The knowledge of my innocence has given me strength in the darkest times of this ordeal."

In September 2015, the delegate supreme judge, court adviser Mr. Gennaro Marasca, made public the reasons of absolution. First, none of the evidence demonstrated that either Knox or Sollecito was present at the crime scene. Second, they cannot have "materially participated in the homicide", since absolutely no "biological traces ... could be attributed to them in the room of the murder or on the body of the victim, where in contrast numerous traces were found attributable to Guede".

References

Further reading

Books

Judicial reports
 "Corte di Assise di Appello Perugia: On the acquittal of Amanda Knox and Raffaele Sollecito.". Claudio Pratillo Hellmann and Massimo Zanetti, (Court of Appeals) Perugia 2011
"La Sapienza to the Corte di Assise di Appello, regarding DNA evidence in the case against Amanda Knox and Raffaele Sollecito". Stefano Conti and Carlo Vecchiotti Court of Appeals Perugia 2011

External links

BBC News. Photograph of Via della Pergola 7.
The Guardian. "Meredith Kercher", collection of articles.

2007 in international relations
2007 murders in Italy
2000s trials
2010s trials
21st century in Umbria
Crime in Umbria
Deaths by person in Italy
Incidents of violence against women
British diaspora in Italy
Italy–United States relations
Murder trials
November 2007 crimes
November 2007 events in Europe
Overturned convictions in Italy
Perugia
Trials in Italy
Violence against women in Italy